Nyírmihálydi is a village in Szabolcs-Szatmár-Bereg County, Hungary. As of the 2011 Hungarian census the village had a population of 1,995, an increase of 155 from 2001.

References

Populated places in Szabolcs-Szatmár-Bereg County